Erysimum canescens is a species of flowering plant belonging to the family Brassicaceae.

Synonym:
 Erysimum platyphyllum Schur
 Erysimum rigens Jord.
 Erysimum ruscinonense Jord.

References

canescens